The Houston Dash is a professional women's soccer team based in Houston, Texas. It joined the National Women's Soccer League (NWSL) in the 2014 season, and is affiliated with the MLS team Houston Dynamo FC.

History

Establishment

On November 19, 2013, the Houston Dynamo began talks in the initial stages with the intention of bringing a top flight women's professional soccer franchise to Houston. Just a week later, the effort was bolstered when the Dynamo began accepting refundable deposits for a potential NWSL expansion team. On December 11, 2013, the National Women's Soccer League awarded the Houston Dynamo and the city of Houston an expansion franchise.

Team name, crest, and colors

During a press conference on December 12, 2013, Houston Dynamo president Chris Canetti announced that the club would be named the Houston Dash and would share similar colors to the Dynamo: orange, black, and sky blue. The crest features a soccer ball along with the words "Houston Dash" with sky blue lines in the background. The name Dash refers to the fast running speed of a horse, which was a historical mode of transportation for Texans in the 1800s.

Ownership and team management
Houston Dash is owned by the same ownership group as the Dynamo, including majority owner Ted Segal, and minority owners Gabriel Brener, Ben Guill, multiple World and Olympic boxing champion Oscar De La Hoya, and former NBA MVP James Harden.

On December 23, 2013, Former Houston Dynamo player Brian Ching was named Managing Director, in charge of day-to-day duties on both the business and technical sides of under the supervision of Houston Dash and Dynamo team president Chris Canetti.

On January 3, 2014, Randy Waldrum was named as the Dash's first head coach, having previously coached the Notre Dame Fighting Irish women's soccer team to two national titles since joining the team in 1999.

On May 29, 2017, Waldrum and Houston Dash agreed to part ways. Assistant coach Omar Morales was named interim coach.

On November 27, 2017, Vera Pauw was hired as the new head coach. On September 20, 2018, Pauw departed from the club.

On December 11, 2018, James Clarkson was hired as the new head coach.

On February 2, 2022, the Dash announced the hiring of Jessica O'Neill as the team's first president, a role tasked with increasing revenue and serving as the team's spokesperson to the NWSL on league matters.

On April 26, 2022, the NWSL and NWSLPA recommended coach James Clarkson should be suspended while they conducted "an investigation into alleged violations of the NWSL Policy to Prevent and Eliminate Workplace Discrimination, Harassment, and Bullying". On April 27, 2022, the Houston Dash announced that it was immediately suspending James Clarkson pending the conclusion of the joint investigation by the NWSL and NWSLPA that was launched in 2021.

On April 29, 2022, the Houston Dash announced that Sarah Lowdon would serve as the acting head coach while the club conducted its search for an interim head coach. On June 15, 2022, the Dash named former Real Betis Féminas and Tottenham Hotspur coach Juan Carlos Amorós as its interim head coach. Lowdon continued as acting head coach pending Amorós's visa approval. 

On August 25, 2022, the Dash announced that majority owner Ted Segal bought out the stakes of minority owners Gabriel Brener, Oscar De La Hoya, and Ben Guill.

On December 14, 2022, the Dash released a public statement declaring the club would not renew the contract with James Clarkson, which had an expiration date of the end of 2022, after reports concluded that his "actions constituted emotional misconduct." Sam Laity was hired as the next head coach on December 21, 2022.

Stadium

The Dash play their games at Shell Energy Stadium, formerly known as BBVA Stadium, which opened in May 2012, and features a 22,039-seat capacity. For the team's inaugural season, 7,000 seats in the lower seating bowl are available for home games. When the stadium opened in 2012, it became the first soccer-specific stadium in Major League Soccer located in a city's downtown district.

Players and staff

Current squad

Staff

Head coach history

Seasons

DNQ = Did not qualify

Honors
 NWSL Challenge Cup
 Winners: 2020
 NWSL Community Shield
 Runners-up: 2020

Broadcasting

During the 2014 season, games were broadcast locally on CSN TV in Houston. It was the second local television broadcast agreement in the NWSL's history. On August 6, 2014, DirecTV and AT&T proposed a reorganization plan, in which it would acquire CSN Houston in a 60/40 joint venture. At the time, AT&T was in the process of acquiring DirecTV, pending regulatory approval. The reorganization offer was approved by the court on October 30, 2014, although Comcast appealed the decision in order to address a $100 million loan that had been given to the network. Attorneys from the companies involved reached an agreement to allow the deal to continue through Comcast's appeals process. The Rockets' general counsel Rafael Stone stated that the approval gave a "clear path" for the network to return to full-time service in November, and transition to DirecTV's Root Sports brand, and the network subsequently cancelled all of its existing studio shows on October 22, 2014. Select Houston Dash matches continued to be aired on Root Sports through the 2015 and 2016 seasons.

As of the 2017 season, Dash games were streamed exclusively by Go90 for American audiences and via the NWSL website for international viewers. As part of a three-year agreement with A&E Networks, Lifetime broadcasts one NWSL Game of the Week on Saturday afternoons. For the 2017 season, the Dash were featured in five nationally broadcast Lifetime NWSL Game of the Week  broadcasts on May 6, May 3, and September 23, 2017.

In July 2022, the club announced plans to broadcast matches locally on AT&T SportsNet Southwest, the team's first local agreement since 2016.

See also

 List of top-division football clubs in CONCACAF countries
 List of professional sports teams in the United States and Canada

References

External links

 

 
2013 establishments in Texas
Association football clubs established in 2013
Soccer clubs in Texas
Houston
Dash